Sharman is an English surname. Notable people with the surname include:

 Alison Sharman, British children's TV executive
 Bill Sharman (1926–2013), U.S. basketball player and coach
 Brenda Leithleiter Sharman, American beauty queen
 Brett Sharman (born 1987), South African Rugby Union player
 Charles Henry Ludovic Sharman (1881–1970), Canadian civil servant
 Charlotte Sharman (1832–1929), English humanitarian
 Colin Sharman, Baron Sharman (born 1943), British chairman of the Aviva Group
 Elizabeth Sharman (born 1957), British slalom and sprint canoer
 Daniel Sharman (born 1986), British actor
 Dew Sharman (born 1965), Suriname politician
 Helen Sharman (born 1963), British astronaut
 H. B. Sharman (1865–1953), Canadian Biblical scholar
 James Sharman, English television producer and sportscaster
 Jim Sharman (born 1945), Australian film and stage director and writer
 Jimmy Sharman (1887–1965), Australian boxing promoter
 John Edward Sharman (1892–1917), Canadian World War I flying ace
 John Fowler (British Army officer), whose middle name is Sharman
 Lucy Tyler-Sharman (born 1965), Australian cyclist
 Mark Sharman (born 1950), British broadcasting administrator
 Ralph Sharman (1895–1918), American Major League baseball player
 Robin Sharman (born 1979), English cyclist
 Samuel Sharman (1879–1951), American sports shooter
 William Sharman (born 1984), British international sprint hurdler

Sharman is also (less often) a given name, and may refer to

Geoffrey Sharman Dawes (1918–1996), English psychologist
 George Lennox Sharman Shackle (1903–1992), English economist
 Sharman Apt Russell (born 1954), American science writer
 Sharman Douglas (1928–1996), American socialite
 Sharman Joshi (born 1979), Bollywood film actor
 Sharman Kadish (born 1959), English historian
 Sharman Macdonald (born 1951), Scottish playwright and mother of Keira Knightley
 Sharman Stone (born 1951), Australian politician
 William Sharman Crawford (1781–1861), Irish politician

See also
 Sharman Networks, company owning the rights to the KaZaA file sharing software
 Sharman (TV series), a British TV series about a private detective (1996)
 List of Old English (Anglo-Saxon) surnames

English-language surnames